Trivia Master is a color arcade game created by Enerdyne in 1985. The game system was designed by Scott Boden, who previously worked on Star Castle and Solar Quest. The software and graphic design was done by Tim Skelly, who also designed games for Cinematronics, Gremlin, and Gottlieb.

Trivia Master was designed as a countertop coin-operated game, and as a conversion board set for existing upright games. Replacement trivia questions were sold in the form of Eproms that plugged into the mother board. Four sets, or categories, could be loaded at one time. The graphics board used was originally from Japanese games bought at auction in bulk from Cinematronics.

All of the trivia questions were researched from a team of employees at Enerdyne. The most popular category was "Sex Trivia."

References

External links
 KLOV's entry for Trivia Master

Arcade video games
Arcade-only video games
1985 video games
Quiz video games
Video games developed in the United States